Alien Nation: Dark Horizon (original airdate: October 25, 1994) is a television film made as a continuation of the Alien Nation television series. Produced by the Fox Network, Alien Nation lasted a single season, ending in 1990 with a cliffhanger series finale.  Dark Horizon  was written to be the season opener for the second season, but when the series was unexpectedly canceled and looked like it might never return to television, the plot was published as a book. Finally, four years later (after a change in management at Fox), Alien Nation: Dark Horizon appeared as a television film to pick up where the television series left off.

Alien Nation: Dark Horizon was written by Andrew Schneider and Diane Frolov, and was directed by Kenneth Johnson.

Plot
In a recapitulation of the series' cliffhanger, Alien Nation: Dark Horizon begins with Susan Francisco and her daughter Emily falling victim to a newly developed viral infection that was created by a group of human Purists to exterminate the Newcomer species.  There is also a new sub-plot running parallel to this one, the story of Ahpossno, a Tenctonese Overseer who lands on Earth to find any surviving Tenctonese and bring them back into slavery. The idea of a signal sent into space by the surviving Overseers was explored in the Alien Nation episode "Contact".

The series episode ended with contaminated flowers being delivered to the Francisco family and Cathy informing Matt that they have been hospitalized. Dark Horizon re-stages these events so that George Francisco is not present.

Cast

Main cast
All of the original cast returned from the television series for the television movie.

Additional cast

References

External links
 

Action television films
American science fiction action films
Dark Horizon
1994 television films
1994 films
1990s science fiction action films
Films directed by Kenneth Johnson (producer)
Films based on television series
American science fiction television films
Films set in Los Angeles
Films set in the future
Television sequel films
Television series reunion films
Films set in 1999
Television films based on television series
20th Century Fox Television films
1990s American films